This is a list of all the Northern Ireland Executives.

List

See also 
List of British ministries
List of Scottish Governments
List of Welsh Governments

Notes

References

Northern Ireland Executive
Executives